Niilo Emil Koponen (March 6, 1928 – December 3, 2013) was an American educator and politician.

Early life
Born in New York City to Finnish parents, he lived with them in a housing cooperative in a Jewish neighborhood in the Bronx. Koponen attended the High School of Music & Art in New York City.

Education
He attended Cooper Union with a major in civil engineering from 1947 to 1948, then attended what is now known as Central State College in Wilberforce, Ohio with a B.S. 1952 in social administration and sociology. In 1957, Koponen received a B.Ed from the University of Alaska in education and anthropology, along with a teaching certificate. In 1958-59, he and his family moved for him to study anthropology from the London School of Economics, where he received honors. In 1964-66, the family again left Fairbanks, where he studied educational administration at Harvard University's Graduate School of Education and received his doctorate.

Move to Alaska
At that point, he married a Boston-born student from the adjacent Antioch College (they met folk dancing) and they moved to Fairbanks, Alaska in 1952 with his wife, homesteading 160 acres on Chena Ridge and they raised five children.

He worked several jobs, including as an electrician on the F.E. Company's gold dredges. Koponen's resumé was very extensive.

He taught in elementary school and was principal of University Park Elementary School of the Fairbanks North Star Borough School District.  He resurrected the Fairbanks branch of Head Start, serving as Executive Director 1972-1976.

During his time in Alaska, Koponen was very involved in his community, serving on the City of Fairbanks Parks and Recreation Commission (1970–73), Chena Community Association, Fairbanks Administrative Committee on Social Services, Chairman Fairbanks Head Start Association (1967–71), Kiwanis, Tanana Valley State Fair Board of Directors (1959–63, 1967–70) and served on the Fairbanks ACLU  from 1972-1976. He was co-founder of the Alaska Federation for Community Self Reliance which sponsored the Fairbanks Community Garden.

He helped organized the Greater Fairbanks Teachers Credit Union, serving on the board 1958-62, 1966-72. This credit union later became the Northern Schools Credit Union, then the Spirit of Alaska Federal Credit Union). He also organized the Chena Goldstream Volunteer Fire Department. He and his wife donated the property on which the Department's Station 2 now resides.

He was engaged as an active Quaker, co-founding the Chena Ridge Friends Meeting in Fairbanks.

Alaska House of Representatives
Koponen served in the Alaska House of Representatives in 1982-1992 as a Democrat. In 1982, Koponen defeated Ken Fanning, one of the country's only Libertarian legislators taking approximately 61% of the vote. He was one of thirteen members of Democratic Socialists of America to be elected to a state legislature that year.

He served in the 13th, 14th, 15th, 16th, and 17th Legislatures.  He represented the 21st district. During lean times when constituents would ask to cut the budget, his response was to ask "what program or service do you currently benefit from do you want to cut?"

Koponen was one of a few members of the Democratic Socialists of America to be elected to public office.

Death
Koponen died at the Pioneer's Home in Fairbanks on December 3, 2013, and a memorial was held January 5, 2014.

References

External links
 Niilo Emil Koponen obituary
 Koponen family website
 Niilo Koponen at 100 Years of Alaska's Legislature
 Draft for New Left article referenced in Note 2 above
 Alaska Election Results history

1928 births
2013 deaths
American people of Finnish descent
American school administrators
Businesspeople from Fairbanks, Alaska
Schoolteachers from Alaska
Harvard University alumni
Democratic Party members of the Alaska House of Representatives
Democratic Socialists of America politicians from Alaska
People from the Bronx
University of Alaska Fairbanks alumni
Wilberforce University alumni
Educators from New York City
20th-century American businesspeople